Sverresson is a Nordic surname. Notable people with the surname include:

 Sigurd Sverresson (died  1200) 
 Haakon Sverresson (1182–1204), King of Norway 1202–1204
 Odd Sverressøn Klingenberg (1871–1944), Norwegian barrister and politician

Surnames of Scandinavian origin